The Robarts Research Institute at the University of Western Ontario awards the annual J. Allyn Taylor International Prize in Medicine to an individual or individuals who have made significant contributions to a field of basic or clinical research in one of the Institute's principal areas of research.

See also

 List of medicine awards

References

Medicine awards
Canadian science and technology awards
Awards established in 1985
1985 establishments in Ontario